Kuzomen is the name of several rural localities in Russia:
Kuzomen, Arkhangelsk Oblast, a village in Leunovsky Selsoviet of Kholmogorsky District of Arkhangelsk Oblast
Kuzomen, Murmansk Oblast, a selo in Tersky District of Murmansk Oblast